Vinzenz Dittrich (23 February 1893 – 25 January 1965) was an Austrian professional football player, who played as a defender, and manager. He played for SK Rapid Wien, and coached Hakoah Vienna, Olympique de Marseille, DSV Saaz and FC Nordstern Basel.

References and notes

External links
 Profile at Rapid Archiv

1893 births
1965 deaths
Footballers from Vienna
Austrian footballers
Austria international footballers
SK Rapid Wien players
Austrian expatriate football managers
Expatriate football managers in Czechoslovakia
Austrian expatriate sportspeople in Czechoslovakia
Expatriate football managers in France
Austrian expatriate sportspeople in France
Expatriate football managers in Lebanon
Austrian expatriate sportspeople in Lebanon
Expatriate football managers in Lithuania
Austrian expatriate sportspeople in Lithuania
Expatriate football managers in Switzerland
Austrian expatriate sportspeople in Switzerland
Austrian football managers
Lithuania national football team managers
Olympique de Marseille managers
ŠK Slovan Bratislava managers
Syria national football team managers
Lebanon national football team managers
Association football defenders
Burials at Ottakring Cemetery